Jordan Raycroft is a Canadian singer-songwriter. His debut solo album, titled Jordan Raycroft (2013), was nominated for a Juno Award in 2014.

Discography

Solo
Jordan Raycroft (2013)

Raycroft
Ero Cras (2014)
 Dream House Sessions (2015)
Woman of My Dreams (2016)

References

1991 births
Canadian performers of Christian music
Living people
Musicians from Ontario
University of Guelph alumni
21st-century Canadian male singers